Ålidhem is a residential area in Umeå, Sweden. About 9,000 people live in Ålidhem, which is located about 3 km outside the city centre. It was built between 1966 and 1973 as a part of the Million Programme and, because of the proximity to the Umeå University campus, many of the buildings are student residences.

Image gallery

References

External links

 Five events that shaped Ålidhem
 Ålidhem at Umeå Municipality

Umeå
Student quarters